The 2019–20 UEFA Youth League knockout phase (play-offs and round of 16 onwards) began on 11 February 2020 with the play-off round and ended with the final on 25 August 2020 at Colovray Stadium in Nyon, Switzerland, to decide the champions of the 2019–20 UEFA Youth League. A total of 24 teams competed in the knockout phase (play-offs and round of 16 onwards).

Times are CET/CEST, as listed by UEFA (local times, if different, are in parentheses).

Qualified teams

UEFA Champions League Path

Domestic Champions Path

Format
The knockout phase (play-offs and round of 16 onwards), played as a single-elimination tournament, involved 24 teams: sixteen teams which qualified from the UEFA Champions League Path (eight group winners and eight group runners-up), and eight teams which qualified from the Domestic Champions Path (eight second round winners):
The eight group winners from the UEFA Champions League Path entered the round of 16.
The eight group runners-up from the UEFA Champions League Path and the eight second round winners from the Domestic Champions Path entered the play-offs. The eight play-off winners advanced to the round of 16.

Each tie was played over a single match. If the score was level after full-time, the match was decided by a penalty shoot-out (no extra time was played).

Schedule
The schedule was as follows (all draws were held at the UEFA headquarters in Nyon, Switzerland).

Following the round of 16, the competition was postponed indefinitely due to the COVID-19 pandemic in Europe. The final tournament consisting of the semi-finals and final, originally scheduled to be played on 17 and 20 April 2020 at the Colovray Stadium in Nyon, Switzerland, were officially postponed on 18 March 2020. A working group was set up by UEFA to decide the calendar of the remainder of the season, with the final decision made at the UEFA Executive Committee meeting on 17 June 2020.

Play-offs

The draw for the play-offs was held on 16 December 2019, 14:00 CET (UTC+1), at the UEFA headquarters in Nyon, Switzerland. The eight second round winners from the Domestic Champions Path were drawn against the eight group runners-up from the UEFA Champions League Path, with the teams from the Domestic Champions Path hosting the match. Teams from the same association could not be drawn against each other.

The play-offs were played on 11 and 12 February 2020. The eight play-off winners advanced to the round of 16, where they were joined by the eight group winners from the UEFA Champions League Path.

|}

Bracket (round of 16 onwards)

The draw for the round of 16 onwards was held on 14 February 2020, 13:00 CET (UTC+1), at the UEFA headquarters in Nyon, Switzerland. The mechanism of the draws for each round was as follows:
In the draw for the round of 16, there were no seedings, and the sixteen teams (eight UEFA Champions League Path group winners and eight play-off winners) were drawn into eight ties. Teams from the same UEFA Champions League Path group could not be drawn against each other, but teams from the same association could be drawn against each other. The draw also decided the home team for each round of 16 match.
In the draws for the quarter-finals onwards, there were no seedings, and teams from the same UEFA Champions League Path group or the same association could be drawn against each other (the identity of the quarter-final winners and onwards was not known at the time of the draws). The draws also decided the home team for each quarter-final, and which quarter-final and semi-final winners were designated as the "home" team for each semi-final and final (for administrative purposes as they were played at a neutral venue).

Round of 16

Six of the eight round of 16 matches were played on 3, 4 and 10 March 2020, while the remaining two matches could not be played as scheduled due to concerns over the COVID-19 pandemic in Europe. They were rescheduled to 16 August 2020 at Colovray Stadium, Nyon.

|}
Notes

Quarter-finals

The quarter-finals, originally scheduled to be played on 17 and 18 March 2020, were postponed due to concerns over the COVID-19 pandemic in Europe. They were rescheduled to 18 and 19 August 2020 at Colovray Stadium, Nyon.

|}

Semi-finals

The semi-finals, originally scheduled to be played on 17 April 2020 at Colovray Stadium, Nyon, were postponed due to concerns over the COVID-19 pandemic in Europe. They were rescheduled to 22 August 2020.

|}

Final

The final, originally scheduled to be played on 20 April 2020 at Colovray Stadium, Nyon, was postponed due to concerns over the COVID-19 pandemic in Europe. It was rescheduled to 25 August 2020.

Notes

References

External links

UEFA Youth League Matches: 2019–20, UEFA.com

3
February 2020 sports events in Europe
March 2020 sports events in Europe
August 2020 sports events in Europe
Association football events postponed due to the COVID-19 pandemic